Scorpion spider may refer to:

 Platyoides and other genera of family Trochanteriidae
 Arachnura in the family Araneidae

Note:
The latter group is also named Scorpion-tailed Spiders, to distinguish them from the first group which is tailless.

Set index articles on spiders